André Nogueira Gomes (born 20 October 2004) is a Portuguese professional footballer who plays as a goalkeeper for Benfica B.

Club career
Gomes began his career with the Académica de Futebol in Ponte de Lima, before moving to Benfica affiliate CFT in Braga. He joined the Benfica academy in 2016, going on to sign a professional contract in December 2020. In September 2021, he was included in English newspaper The Guardian's "Next Generation" list for the year, highlighting the best footballers born in 2004 worldwide. He became the youngest goalkeeper to play in a UEFA Youth League final, beating the record held by Croatian Karlo Žiger, when he played all 90 minutes in Benfica's 6–0 win over Red Bull Salzburg in the 2021–22 UEFA Youth League final.

International career
Gomes has represented Portugal at youth international level.

Career statistics

Club

Notes

References

External links
 Profile at the S.L. Benfica website

2004 births
Living people
People from Ponte de Lima
Portuguese footballers
Portugal youth international footballers
Association football goalkeepers
Liga Portugal 2 players
S.L. Benfica B players